The Coosan (also Coos or Kusan) language family consists of two languages spoken along the southern Oregon coast. Both languages are now extinct.

Classification
 Hanis †
 Miluk † ( Lower Coquille)

Melville Jacobs (1939) says that the languages are as close as Dutch and German. They share more than half of their vocabulary, though this is not always obvious, and grammatical differences cause the two languages to look quite different.

The origin of the name Coos is uncertain: one idea is that it is derived from a Hanis stem gus- meaning 'south' as in gusimídži·č 'southward'; another idea is that it is derived from a southwestern Oregon Athabaskan word ku·s meaning 'bay'.

Frachtenburg was the first major ethnolinguist to address the relatedness of these languages, saying that Hanis and Miluk were dialects of the same "Kusan" language. Melville Jacobs also said that they were two dialects of the same languages; though he did note that Mrs. Annie Miner Peterson said they were in fact distinct languages and that Miluk had two dialects. In 1916 Edward Sapir suggested that the Coosan languages are part of a larger Oregon Penutian genetic grouping. This analysis has been accepted by some. 

However, more recent work has placed Hanis and Miluk as both separate languages and part of their own language family, with Douglas-Tavani doing a comparative reconstruction of Proto-Coosan's phonemes and vocabulary

Phonology

Vowels

Diphthongs

Three Series of Stops

Consonants

Key 

 Glottal Stops are represented by ʔ for subscript epsilon
 Ejectives raised by an apostrophe (pʼ) can be substituted as exclamation points (p!)
 Length and gemination are shown by a dot (m·)

 Campbell, Lyle. (1997). American Indian languages: The Historical Linguistics of Native America. New York: Oxford University Press. .
 Frachtenberg, Leo J. (1914). Lower Umpqua texts and notes on the Kusan dialects. Columbia University Contributions to Anthropology (Vol. 4, pp. 141–150). (Reprinted 1969, New York: AMS Press).

 Atlas of languages of intercultural communication in the Pacific, Asia, and the Americas
 Mithun, Marianne. (1999). The Languages of Native North America. Cambridge: Cambridge University Press.  (hbk); .
 Whereat, Don. (1992). (Personal communication in Mithun 1999).
 Jacobs, Melville. (1940). Coos Narrative and Ethnologic Texts. University of Washington: Seattle.
 DeLancey, S., & Golla, V. (1997). ‘The Penutian Hypothesis: Retrospect and Prospect’. International Journal of American Linguistics, 63(1), 171-202.
 Douglas-Tavani, Jordan AG. (2021). 'Languages of the Bay: On the Proto-Coosan Hypothesis'. University of California: Santa Barbara. https://escholarship.org/uc/item/20f1966w

External links

Confederated Tribes of Coos, Lower Umpqua, and Siuslaw homepage
Languages of Oregon - Coos
Coos, Lower Umpqua & Siuslaw Tribes profile

 
Coast Oregon Penutian languages
Language families